Subianto is a surname of Indonesian origin. Notable people with the surname include:

Antonius Subianto Bunjamin (born 1968), Indonesian Roman catholic priest
Bambang Subianto (1945–2022), Indonesian academic and politician
Prabowo Subianto (born 1951), Indonesian politician, businessman and army officer